Ballievey Bridge spans the River Bann at Ballievey, near Banbridge, County Down, Northern Ireland.

The original suspension bridge was from a design by James Dredge, Sr. Destroyed in 1988 under the weight of a lorry, it was the only one within the Dredge's Ulster group which was not a footbridge. A replacement bridge was erected thereafter.

References

Bridges in Northern Ireland
Buildings and structures in County Down